West Side Historic District is a national historic district located at Hendersonville, Henderson County, North Carolina.  The district encompasses 245 contributing buildings in a predominantly residential section of Hendersonville developed from the early 1900s to the late 1940s. It includes notable examples of Colonial Revival, and Bungalow / American Craftsman residential architecture.  Located in the district is the contributing Ambassador Apartments (c. 1926) and Rosa Edwards Elementary School (c. 1910).

It was listed on the National Register of Historic Places in 2001.

References

Historic districts on the National Register of Historic Places in North Carolina
Colonial Revival architecture in North Carolina
Buildings and structures in Henderson County, North Carolina
National Register of Historic Places in Henderson County, North Carolina
Hendersonville, North Carolina